The 2014–15 Philadelphia 76ers season was the 76th season of the franchise in the National Basketball Association (NBA).

The 76ers 2013 NBA draft pick, Nerlens Noel, would play his first season in a Sixer uniform, but for the third straight year, they acquired a center (by draft or trade) that would not play for them the first year, as number 3 overall pick Joel Embiid was out with foot and back issues. Michael Carter Williams was traded to the Milwaukee Bucks for draft picks. On December 1, 2014, the 76ers lost their 17th straight game to start the season 0–17, one loss shy of the New Jersey Nets 0–18 mark in 2009–10. On December 3, the 76ers won their first game of the season against the Minnesota Timberwolves avoiding the worst start without a win. The team finished with a record of 18–64 tied for the third worst record in franchise history (1995–1996, 18 wins; 2015–2016, 10 wins; 1972–1973, 9 wins).

Preseason

Draft picks

Regular season

Standings

Game log

Preseason

|- style="background:#fcc;"
| 1
| October 6
| @ Boston
| 
| Tony Wroten (19)
| Henry Sims (10)
| Tony Wroten (5)
| TD Garden14,143
| 0–1
|- style="background:#cfc;"
| 2
| October 8
| Charlotte
| 
| Tony Wroten (15)
| Nerlens Noel (9)
| Tony Wroten (7)
| Wells Fargo Center8,141
| 1–1
|- style="background:#fcc;"
| 3
| October 10
| @ Minnesota
| 
| Henry Sims (17)
| Henry Sims (6)
| Casper Ware (7)
| Target Center9,076
| 1–2
|- style="background:#fcc;"
| 4
| October 14
| New York
| 
| Nerlens Noel (12)
| Nerlens Noel (11)
| Casper Ware (5)
| Carrier Dome11,259
| 1–3
|- style="background:#fcc;"
| 5
| October 16
| Boston
| 
| Elliot Williams (17)
| Henry Sims (10)
| Casper Ware (6)
| Wells Fargo Center8,201
| 1–4
|- style="background:#cfc;"
| 6
| October 18
| Orlando
| 
| Drew Gordon (16)
| Arnett Moultrie (8)
| Elliot Williams (5)
| PPL Center5,764
| 2–4
|- style="background:#fcc;"
| 7
| October 20
| @ Brooklyn
| 
| Henry Sims (13)
| Drew Gordon (9)
| Brandon Davies (5)
| Barclays Center12,271
| 2–5
|- style="background:#fcc;"
| 8
| October 23
| @ Detroit
| 
| Henry Sims (17)
| Nerlens Noel (8)
| Tony Wroten (5)
| Palace of Auburn Hills11,666
| 2–6

Regular season

|- style="background:#fcc;"
| 1
| October 29
| @ Indiana
| 
| Tony Wroten (22)
| Nerlens Noel (10)
| Tony Wroten (7)
| Bankers Life Fieldhouse18,165
| 0–1
|- style="background:#fcc;"
| 2
| October 31
| @ Milwaukee
| 
| Hollis Thompson (15)
| Nerlens Noel (10)
| Tony Wroten (6)
| BMO Harris Bradley Center18,717
| 0–2

|- style="background:#fcc;"
| 3
| November 1
| Miami
| 
| Tony Wroten (21)
| Malcolm Thomas (9)
| Tony Wroten (10)
| Wells Fargo Center19,753
| 0–3
|- style="background:#fcc;"
| 4
| November 3
| Houston
| 
| Tony Wroten (20)
| Tony Wroten (5)
| Nerlens Noel (5)
| Wells Fargo Center12,896
| 0–4
|- style="background:#fcc;"
| 5
| November 5
| Orlando
| 
| Tony Wroten (27)
| Hollis Thompson (9)
| Tony Wroten (8)
| Wells Fargo Center12,111
| 0–5
|- style="background:#fcc;"
| 6
| November 7
| Chicago
| 
| Tony Wroten (31)
| Luc Mbah a Moute (11)
| Tony Wroten (7)
| Wells Fargo Center16,820
| 0–6
|- style="background:#fcc;"
| 7
| November 9
| @ Toronto
| 
| Tony Wroten (18)
| Henry Sims (8)
| Tony Wroten (5)
| Air Canada Centre18,470
| 0–7
|- style="background:#fcc;"
| 8
| November 13
| @ Dallas
| 
| Michael Carter-Williams (19)
| Michael Carter-Williams (8)
| Michael Carter-Williams (5)
| American Airlines Center19,604
| 0–8
|- style="background:#fcc;"
| 9
| November 14
| @ Houston
| 
| Tony Wroten (19)
| Luc Mbah a Moute (9)
| Tony Wroten (8)
| Toyota Center18,138
| 0–9
|- style="background:#fcc;"
| 10
| November 17
| @ San Antonio
| 
| Michael Carter-Williams (16)
| Henry Sims (8)
| Carter-Williams & Brandon Davies (4)
| AT&T Center18,581
| 0–10
|- style="background:#fcc;"
| 11
| November 19
| Boston
| 
| Tony Wroten (21)
| Nerlens Noel (8)
| Tony Wroten (7)
| Wells Fargo Center12,701
| 0–11
|- style="background:#fcc;"
| 12
| November 21
| Phoenix
| 
| Michael Carter-Williams (18)
| Henry Sims (7)
| Michael Carter-Williams (6)
| Wells Fargo Center16,789
| 0–12
|- style="background:#fcc;"
| 13
| November 22
| @ New York
| 
| Nerlens Noel (17)
| Nerlens Noel (12)
| Tony Wroten (7)
| Madison Square Garden19,812
| 0–13
|- style="background:#fcc;"
| 14
| November 24
| Portland
| 
| Michael Carter-Williams (24)
| Michael Carter-Williams (7)
| Tony Wroten (9)
| Wells Fargo Center11,094
| 0–14
|- style="background:#fcc;"
| 15
| November 26
| Brooklyn
| 
| Tony Wroten & K.J. McDaniels (18)
| Henry Sims (7)
| Tony Wroten (9)
| Wells Fargo Center11,223
| 0–15
|- style="background:#fcc;"
| 16
| November 29
| Dallas
| 
| K.J. McDaniels (21)
| K.J. McDaniels (13)
| Michael Carter-Williams (16)
| Wells Fargo Center16,145
| 0–16

|- style="background:#fcc;"
| 17
| December 1
| San Antonio
| 
| Michael Carter-Williams (24)
| Michael Carter-Williams (11)
| Michael Carter-Williams (7)
| Wells Fargo Center12,843
| 0–17
|- style="background:#cfc;"
| 18
| December 3
| @ Minnesota
| 
| Michael Carter-Williams (20)
| Carter-Williams & Luc Mbah a Moute (9)
| Michael Carter-Williams (9)
| Target Center10,463
| 1–17
|- style="background:#fcc;"
| 19
| December 5 NBA TV
| Oklahoma City
| 
| Robert Covington (21)
| Nerlens Noel (10)
| Michael Carter-Williams (14)
| Wells Fargo Center15,092
| 1–18
|- style="background:#cfc;"
| 20
| December 6
| @ Detroit
| 
| Robert Covington (25)
| Luc Mbah a Moute (11)
| Michael Carter-Williams (15)
| The Palace of Auburn Hills16,514
| 2–18
|- style="background:#fcc;"
| 21
| December 10
| @ Atlanta
| 
| Alexey Shved (13)
| Michael Carter-Williams (10)
| Michael Carter-Williams (9)
| Philips Arena11,733
| 2–19
|- style="background:#fcc;"
| 22
| December 12
| @ Brooklyn
| 
| Robert Covington (20)
| Carter-Williams & Covington & Noel (6)
| Michael Carter-Williams (9)
| Barclays Center16,326
| 2–20
|- style="background:#fcc;"
| 23
| December 13
| Memphis
| 
| Robert Covington (24)
| Michael Carter-Williams (11)
| Michael Carter-Williams (11) 
| Wells Fargo Center13,698
| 2–21
|- style="background:#fcc;"
| 24
| December 15
| Boston
| 
| Nerlens Noel (19)
| Nerlens Noel (8)
| Michael Carter-Williams (6)
| Wells Fargo Center12,903
| 2–22
|- style="background:#fcc;"
| 25
| December 19
| Charlotte
| 
| Covington, Wroten (19)
| Nerlens Noel (9)
| Michael Carter-Williams (10)
| Wells Fargo Center13,398
| 2–23
|- style="background:#cfc;"
| 26
| December 21
| @ Orlando
| 
| Michael Carter-Williams (21)
| Noel, Sims (12)
| Tony Wroten (7)
| Amway Center15,682
| 3–23
|- style="background:#cfc;"
| 27
| December 23
| @ Miami
| 
| Michael Carter-Williams (20)
| Nerlens Noel (10)
| Michael Carter-Williams (5)
| American Airlines Arena19,600
| 4–23
|- style="background:#fcc;"
| 28
| December 26
| @ Portland
| 
| Tony Wroten (22)
| Henry Sims (8)
| Michael Carter-Williams (5)
| Moda Center19,972
| 4–24
|- style="background:#fcc;"
|29
|December 27
| @ Utah
| 
| Tony Wroten (20)
| Nerlens Noel (10)
| Michael Carter-Williams (6)
| EnergySolutions Arena18,890
| 4–25
|- style="background:#fcc;"
| 30
|December 30
|@ Golden State
| 
| Henry Sims (19)
| Robert Covington (9)
| Michael Carter-Williams (6)
| Oracle Arena19,596
| 4–26

|-style="background:#fcc;"
| 31
| January 2
| @ Phoenix
| 
| Tony Wroten (28)
| Luc Mbah a Moute (8)
| Michael Carter-Williams (5)
| US Airways Center16,514
| 4–27
|-style="background:#fcc;"
| 32
|January 3
| @ LA Clippers
| 
| Tony Wroten (27)
| Nerlens Noel (12)
| Tony Wroten (7)
| Staples Center19,060
| 4–28
|-style="background:#cfc;"
| 33
| January 5
| Cleveland
| 
| Tony Wroten (20)
| Furkan Aldemir (10)
| Michael Carter-Williams (13)
| Wells Fargo Center17,771
| 5–28
|-style="background:#fcc;"
| 34
| January 7
| Milwaukee
| 
| K.J. McDaniels (14)
| JaKarr Sampson (7)
| Michael Carter-Williams (5)
| Wells Fargo Center10,288
| 5–29
|-style="background:#cfc;"
| 35
| January 9
| @ Brooklyn
| 
| Robert Covington (20)
| Covington, Carter-Williams (7)
| Michael Carter-Williams (8)
| Barclays Center16,172
| 6–29
|-style="background:#cfc;"
| 36
| January 10
| Indiana
| 
| Tony Wroten (20)
| Sims, Noel (9)
| Carter-Williams, Tony Wroten (9)
| Wells Fargo Center17,496
| 7–29
|-style="background:#fcc;"
| 37
| January 13
| Atlanta
| 
| Michael Carter-Williams (20)
| Michael Carter-Williams (9)
| Carter-Williams, McDaniels, Wroten (4)
| Wells Fargo Center10,466
| 7–30
|-style="background:#fcc;"
| 38
| January 14
| @ Toronto
| 
| Michael Carter-Williams (29)
| Nerlens Noel, McDaniels (8)
| Michael Carter-Williams (4)
| Air Canada Centre19,800
| 7–31
|-style="background:#cfc;"
| 39
| January 16
| New Orleans
| 
| Michael Carter-Williams (22)
| Nerlens Noel (11)
| Michael Carter-Williams (7)
| Wells Fargo Center15,672
| 8–31
|-style="background:#fcc;"
| 40
| January 17
| @ Detroit
| 
| Michael Carter-Williams (15)
| Henry Sims (10)
| Michael Carter-Williams (6)
| The Palace of Auburn Hills15,496
| 8–32
|-style="background:#fcc;"
| 41
| January 19
| @ Washington
| 
| Henry Sims (13)
| Nerlens Noel (7)
| Michael Carter-Williams (5)
| Verizon Center19,040
| 8–33
|-style="background:#fcc;"
| 42
| January 21
| New York
| 
| Michael Carter-Williams (27)
| Henry Sims (12)
| Michael Carter-Williams (7)
| Wells Fargo Center13,201
| 8–34
|-style="background:#fcc;"
| 43
| January 23
| Toronto
| 
| Robert Covington (18)
| Nerlens Noel (14)
| Michael Carter-Williams (9)
| Wells Fargo Center13,640
| 8–35
|-style="background:#fcc;"
| 44
| January 24
| @ Memphis
| 
| Jerami Grant (16)
| Furkan Aldemir (11)
| Michael Carter-Williams (6)
| FedExForum17,579
| 8–36
|-style="background:#fcc;"
| 45
| January 26
| @ New Orleans
| 
| K.J. McDaniels (16)
| Noel, Covington (6)
| Robert Covington (6)
| Smoothie King Center16,419
| 8–37
|-style="background:#cfc;"
| 46
| January 28
| Detroit
| 
| Michael Carter-Williams (14)
| Michael Carter-Williams (9)
| Michael Carter-Williams (10)
| Wells Fargo Center11,213
| 9–37
|-style="background:#cfc;"
| 47
| January 30
| Minnesota
| 
| Luc Mbah a Moute (18)
| Michael Carter-Williams (10)
| Michael Carter-Williams (10)
| Wells Fargo Center14,333
| 10–37
|-style="background:#fcc;"
| 48
| January 31
| @ Atlanta
| 
| Luc Mbah a Moute (18)
| Michael Carter-Williams (10)
| Michael Carter-Williams (10)
| Philips Arena19,006
| 10–38

|-style="background:#fcc;"
| 49
| February 2
| @ Cleveland
| 
| Covington, Grant (18)
| Thompson, Grant (7)
| Michael Carter-Williams (5)
| Quicken Loans Arena20,562
| 10–39
|-style="background:#cfc;"
| 50
| February 3
| Denver
| 
| Hollis Thompson (23)
| Luc Mbah a Moute (10)
| Michael Carter-Williams (13)
| Wells Fargo Center10,290
| 11–39
|-style="background:#fcc;"
| 51
| February 6
| @ Boston
| 
| Luc Richard Mbah a Moute (18)
| Hollis Thompson (8)
| Tim Frazier (10)
| TD Garden18,322
| 11–40
|-style="background:#cfc;"
| 52
| February 7
| Charlotte
| 
| Robert Covington (22)
| Covington, McDaniels (8)
| Tim Frazier (8)
| Wells Fargo Center19,736
| 12–40
|-style="background:#fcc;"
| 53
| February 9
| Golden State
| 
| Robert Covington (21)
| Luc Richard Mbah a Moute (9)
| Tim Frazier (7)
| Wells Fargo Center16,247
| 12–41
|- align="center"
|colspan="9" bgcolor="#bbcaff"|All-Star Break
|-style="background:#fcc;"
| 54
| February 20
| Indiana
| 
| Luc Richard Mbah a Moute, Grant (16)
| Luc Richard Mbah a Moute (10)
| Tim Frazier (7)
| Wells Fargo Center16,777
| 12–42
|-style="background:#fcc;"
| 55
| February 22
| @ Orlando
| 
| Covington, Thompson (16)
| Robert Covington (9)
| Tim Frazier (6)
| Amway Center16,108
| 12–43
|-style="background:#fcc;"
| 56
| February 23
| @ Miami
| 
| Hollis Thompson (22)
| Nerlens Noel (7)
| Ish Smith (7)
| American Airlines Arena19,802
| 12–44
|-style="background:#fcc;"
| 57
| February 25
| @ Milwaukee
| 
| Jason Richardson (16)
| Nerlens Noel (8)
| Isaiah Canaan (6)
| BMO Harris Bradley Center12,763
| 12–45
|-style="background:#cfc;"
| 58
| February 27
| Washington
| 
| Nerlens Noel (14)
| Nerlens Noel (13)
| Ish Smith (6)
| Wells Fargo Center18,089
| 13–45

|-style="background:#fcc;"
| 59
| March 1
| @ Indiana
| 
| Robert Covington (12)
| Nerlens Noel (12)
| Ish Smith (5)
| Bankers Life Fieldhouse16,581
| 13–46
|-style="background:#fcc;"
| 60
| March 2
| Toronto
| 
| Ish Smith (19)
| Nerlens Noel (7)
| Ish Smith (9)
| Wells Fargo Center10,742
| 13–47
|-style="background:#fcc;"
| 61
| Marth 4
| @ Oklahoma City
| 
| Isaiah Canaan (31)
| Luc Richard Mbah a Moute (14)
| Isaiah Canaan (6)
| Chesapeake Energy Arena18,203
| 13–48
|-style="background:#fcc;"
| 62
| March 6
| Utah
| 
| Isaiah Canaan (16)
| Thomas Robinson (12)
| Ish Smith (7)
| Wells Fargo Center15,811
| 13–49
|-style="background:#cfc;"
| 63
| March 7
| Atlanta
| 
| Luc Richard Mbah a Moute (19)
| Nerlens Noel (17)
| Isaiah Canaan (8)
| Wells Fargo Center15,811
| 14-49
|-style="background:#fcc;"
| 64
| March 11
| Chicago
| 
| Ish Smith (23)
| Robinson, Noel (15)
| Ish Smith (6)
| Wells Fargo Center12,400
| 14–50
|-style="background:#cfc;"
| 65
| March 13
| Sacramento
| 
| Robert Covington (24)
| Nerlens Noel (12)
| Ish Smith (9)
| Wells Fargo Center12,331
| 15–50
|-style="background:#fcc;"
| 66
| March 14
| Brooklyn
| 
| Nerlens Noel (17)
| Thomas Robinson (12)
| Ish Smith (5)
| Wells Fargo Center14,865
| 15–51
|-style="background:#fcc;"
| 67
| March 16
| @ Boston
| 
| Nerlens Noel (18)
| Nerlens Noel (7)
| Ish Smith (4)
| TD Garden16,553
| 15–52
|-style="background:#cfc;"
| 68
| March 18
| Detroit
| 
| Ish Smith (15)
| Robinson, Luc Richard Mbah a Moute, Sampson (6)
| Ish Smith (8)
| Wells Fargo Center10,776
| 16–52
|-style="background:#cfc;"
| 69
| March 20
| New York
| 
| Nerlens Noel (23)
| Nerlens Noel (14)
| Ish Smith (9)
| Wells Fargo Center10,079
| 17–52
|-style="background:#fcc;"
| 70
| March 22
| @ L.A. Lakers
| 
| Thomas Robinson (14)
| Thomas Robinson (8)
| Ish Smith (9)
| Staples Center17,891
| 17–53
|-style="background:#fcc;"
| 71
| March 24
| @ Sacramento
| 
| Robert Covington (21)
| Nerlens Noel (10)
| Ish Smith (7)
| Sleep Train Arena16,636
| 17–54
|-style="background:#cfc;"
| 72
| March 25
| @ Denver
| 
| Robert Covington (25)
| Nerlens Noel (15)
| Grant, Richardson (3)
| Pepsi Center14,068
| 18–54
|-style="background:#fcc;"
| 73
| March 27
| L.A. Clippers
| 
| Nerlens Noel (30)
| Nerlens Noel (14)
| Ish Smith (9)
| Wells Fargo Center16,070
| 18–55
|-style="background:#fcc;"
| 74
| March 29
| @ Cleveland
| 
| Robert Covington (19)
| Nerlens Noel (11)
| Ish Smith (7)
| Quicken Loans Arena20,562
| 18–56
|-style="background:#fcc;"
| 75
| March 30
| L.A. Lakers
| 
| Nerlens Noel (19)
| Nerlens Noel (14)
| Hollis Thompson (5)
| Wells Fargo Center13,501
| 18–57

|-style="background:#fcc;"
| 76
| April 1
| @ Washington
| 
| Ish Smith (23)
| Nerlens Noel (10)
| Isaiah Canaan (6)
| Verizon Center17,501
| 18–58
|-style="background:#fcc;"
| 77
| April 4
| @ Charlotte
| 
| Covington, Smith (15)
| Ish Smith (9)
| Ish Smith (5)
| Time Warner Cable Arena17,286
| 18–59
|-style="background:#fcc;"
| 78
| April 5
| @ New York
| 
| Thompson, Smith (17)
| Aldemir, Noel (9)
| Ish Smith (7)
| Madison Square Garden19,812
| 18–60
|-style="background:#fcc;"
| 79
| April 8
| Washington
| 
| Robert Covington (27)
| Thomas Robinson (12)
| Ish Smith (6)
| Wells Fargo Center12,611
| 18–61
|-style="background:#fcc;"
| 80
| April 11
| @ Chicago
| 
| Robert Covington (22)
| Thomas Robinson (10)
| Robert Covington (5)
| United Center22,273
| 18–62
|-style="background:#fcc;"
| 81
| April 13
| Milwaukee
| 
| Robert Covington (25)
| Covington, Grant (7)
| Ish Smith (9)
| Wells Fargo Center10,598
| 18–63
|-style="background:#fcc;"
| 82
| April 15
| Miami
| 
| JaKarr Sampson (22)
| Henry Sims (11)
| JaKarr Sampson (6)
| Wells Fargo Center14,476
| 18–64

Roster

Roster Notes
 Center Joel Embiid missed the entire season due to a right foot injury.
 Shooting guard Tony Wroten played 30 games but missed the rest of the season after suffering a partially torn ACL in his right knee during a game against the Atlanta Hawks on January 13, 2015.

Transactions

Trades

Free agents

Re-signed

Additions

Subtractions

Awards

References

External links

 2014–15 Philadelphia 76ers preseason at ESPN
 2014–15 Philadelphia 76ers regular season at ESPN

Philadelphia 76ers seasons
Philadelphia 76ers
Philadelphia
Philadelphia